Walter Pfeiffer (12 June 1927 – 10 May 2014) was an Austrian football manager and former player. He managed the Iceland national team in 1968.

He also coached PAOK FC, AGF, B 1909, KR, SC Eisenstadt

References

1927 births
2014 deaths
Austrian footballers
Association football midfielders
Stuttgarter Kickers players
Austrian football managers
PAOK FC managers
Aarhus Gymnastikforening managers
Boldklubben 1909 managers
Iceland national football team managers
Knattspyrnufélag Reykjavíkur managers
Austrian expatriate football managers
Expatriate football managers in Iceland